Baqerabad (also Romanized as Bāqerābād; also known as Baghirābād) is a village in Dashtabi-ye Gharbi Rural District, Dashtabi District, Buin Zahra County, Qazvin Province, Iran. At the 2006 census, its population was 67, in 15 families.

References 

Populated places in Buin Zahra County